Dielsantha is a genus of plants in the family Campanulaceae. It has only one known species, Dielsantha galeopsoides, native to tropical West Africa (Nigeria, Cameroon, Congo-Brazzaville, Equatorial Guinea, Gabon, the islands in the Gulf of Guinea.

References

External links

Lobelioideae
Monotypic Campanulaceae genera
Flora of Africa